The Emperor Waltz (German: Kaiserwalzer) is a 1953 Austrian historical drama film directed by Franz Antel and starring Maria Holst, Rudolf Prack and Winnie Markus. The film's sets were designed by Heinz Ockermüller and Sepp Rothaur. It is set during the era of Empress Elisabeth of Austria.

Cast
 Maria Holst as Kaiserin Elisabeth von Österreich
 Rudolf Prack as Erzherzog Ludwig  
 Winnie Markus as Luise Pichler - Lehrerin  
 Gunther Philipp as Sein Adjutant Ltn. Zauner  
 Hans Holt as Resinger - Lehrer in Ischl  
 Oskar Sima as Bachmaier - Konditor  
 Ilse Peternell as Mizzi - Seine Tochter  
 Paul Westermeier as Hauptmann Krause  
 Angelika Hauff as Tänzerin Anni Wührer  
 Erik Frey as Graf Ferry  
 Pepi Glöckner-Kramer as Anna Riegler  
 Harry Hardt as Fürst Montenuovo  
 Willy Danek as Kaiser Franz Joseph von Österreich
 Erich Dörner as Veterinär Krallitschek  
 Ellen Lauff as Gräfin Mansfweld

References

Bibliography 
 Bock, Hans-Michael & Bergfelder, Tim. The Concise CineGraph. Encyclopedia of German Cinema. Berghahn Books, 2009.

External links 
 

1953 films
1950s historical drama films
Austrian historical drama films
1950s German-language films
Films directed by Franz Antel
Films set in Vienna
Films set in the 1890s
Gloria Film films
Films scored by Hans Lang
1953 drama films
Austrian black-and-white films